Alticus monochrus is a species of combtooth blenny (family Blenniidae) in the genus Alticus. It is a tropical blenny found in the western Indian Ocean including the Comoros Mozambique, Madagascar, the Seychelles and the Mascarene Islands. It can reach a maximum total length of 10 centimetres (3.94 inches). The blennies feed primarily off of benthic algae. They are oviparous.

References

External links
 Alticus monochrus at ITIS
 Alticus monochrus at WoRMS
 Life history characteristics of Alticus monochrus supratidal blenny of the southern Indian Ocean M. Bhikajee, J.M. Green, R. Dunbrack, 2006.

monochrus
Fish described in 1869
Taxa named by Pieter Bleeker